Michiko Itatani is a Chicago-based artist who was born in Osaka, Japan. After she received her BFA (1974) and MFA (1976) at the School of the Art Institute of Chicago in 1974 and 1976 respectively, she returned to her alma mater in 1979 to teach in the Painting and Drawing department. Through her work, Itatani explores identity, continuation, and finding one's way in the modern world. Her work depicts nude figures in an expressionist style. Itatani has received the Illinois Arts Council Artist's Fellowship, the National Endowment for the Arts Fellowship and the John Simon Guggenheim Fellowship. Her work is collected in many museums, including the Museum of Contemporary Art, Olympic Museum, Switzerland; Villa Haiss Museum, Germany; Musée national des beaux-arts du Québec, Canada; Museu D'art Contemporani (MACBA), Spain; and the National Museum of Contemporary Art, South Korea.

Exhibitions 
 Solo & two person exhibitions
 2016 
 Linda Warren Projects, Chicago, IL 9/9-10/22  
 2015 
 Bradley University Heuser Art Gallery, Peoria, IL "Personal Codes III". 8/1-9/17 
 2014 
 Sherry Leedy Contemporary, Kansas City, MO "Itatani & Borgenicht" 
 South Bent Museum of Art, IN "Michiko Itatani and Jake Webster: Passages" 
 2013 
 Linda Warren Projects, Chicago IL, 9/6-10/19, "Cosmic Kaleidoscope"  
 2012    
 Goshen College Art Gallery, Goshen, IN "Cosmic Wanderlust"              
 Rockford College Art Gallery, Rockford, IL "Cosmic Wanderlust"* 
 Printworks, Chicago, IL "CTRL-Home/Echo" Printworks, Inc. (also 2008, 05, 02,1997, 93, 91)  
 2011                  
 O"Cconor Gallery, Dominican University, IL "Cosmic Commentaries", with Cullen Washington 
 Kendall Gallery, Ferris University, Grand Rapids, MI "Cosmic Theater" 
 University Club, Chicago, IL          
 "Visual Analogies and Inquiries: the Work of Michiko Itatani and Birgitta Weimer"         
 Milwaukee Institute of Arts & Design, Milwaukee, WI,  
 2010 
 Olympia Centre (via Nixon Associate) Chicago, IL  
 Handwerker Gallery, Ithaca College, NY "Personal Codes" 
 Red Line, Denver, CO "Close Binary" 
 Corbett vs Dempsey, Chicago, IL "Miniature Itatani – Cosmic Wanderlust" 
 Illinois Wesleyan University, Bloomington, IL "Cosmic Wanderlust" 
 Walsh Gallery, Chicago, IL "Personal Codes"  
 2009  
 Gaddis Geeslin Gallery, Sam Houston University, TX, "Cosmic Theater" 
 2008 
 Flatfile Contemporary, Chicago, IL, "Cosmic Theater II" 
 Printworks, Inc., Chicago, IL, HyperBaroque" 
 2007  
 Eastern Kentucky University, Richmond, KY, "Michiko Itatani" 
 2006  
 Indiana State University Gallery, Terre Haute, IN "Michiko Itatani 
 Flatfile Contemporary, Chicago, IL "Cosmic Theatre" 
 Prudential Building, Chicago, IL "Michiko Itatani" 
 2005 
 H.F. Johnson Gallery, Carthage College, Kenosha, WI, "Virtual Signs / Witness"  
 Shirley/Jones Gallery, Yellowsprings, OH 
 2004 
 Flatfile Contemporary, Chicago, IL 
 Sherry Leedy Gallery, Kansas City, Missouri 
 2003  
 Daum Museum of Contemporary Art, Sedalia, Missouri  
 Spartanburg Museum of Art, Spartanburg, South Carolina  
 2002  
 Fassbender/Stevens Gallery, Chicago, Illinois 
 University of Wyoming Art Museum, Laramie, Wyoming  
 2001  
 Galerie Bhak, Seoul, Korea 
 Fassbender Gallery, Chicago, Illinois (also 1999, 97, 95) 
 Pittsburg State University, Pittsburg, Kansas 
 2000  
 University of Missouri, St. Louis, Missouri  
 Frauen Museum, Bonn, Germany  
 Kent State University, Kent, Ohio 
 1999  
 Elmhurst Museum, Elmhurst, Illinoiso 
 1998  
 Gallery 312, Chicago, Illinois (also 1994) 
 Indianapolis Art Center, Indianapolis, Indiana 
 Tokoha Museum, Shizuoka, Japano 
 1997  
 Charleston Heights Arts Center, Las Vegas, Nevada  
 Galeria Senda, Barcelona, Spain 
 1996  
 Gallery 1, Shinjuku Park Tower, Tokyo, Japan  
 Gallery B.A.I., New York City o 
 1995  
 The John G. Blank Center, Michigan City, Indiana 
 Nexus Contemporary Art Center, Atlanta, Georgia  
 1994 
 Wright Museum of Art, Beloit, Wisconsin, "Ed Paschke/Michiko Itatani"  
 1993  
 Deson-Saunders Gallery, Chicago (also1991, 90)  
 1992  
 University of Wisconsin, Milwaukee Art Museum, Wisconsin  
 Muskegon Museum of Art, Muskegon, Michigan  
 Chicago Cultural Center, Chicago, "Michiko Itatani: Paintings since 1984"  
 1991 
 McIntosh Gallery(Museum), University of Western Ontario, Canada  
 Second Street Gallery, Charlottesville, Virginia  
 1990  
 Gallery Sho, San Francisco, California 
 Amano Gallery, Osaka, Japan (also 1988) 
 Kyoni Gallery, Tokyo, Japan (also 1988)  
 ABC (Asahi Broadcasting) Gallery, Osaka, Japan 
 Anita Shapolsky Gallery, New York City  
 1989  
 University of Colorado Gallery, Bolder, Colorado  
 1988  
 Musée du Quebec, Quebec City, Canada 
 Marianne Deson Gallery, Chicago (also 1987, 84, 82, 80) 
 1987  
 Rockford Art Museum, Rockford, Illinois  
 1985  
 Alternative Museum, New York City 
 Group Exhibitions 
 2015 
 "Roots" Linda Warren Projects, Chicago, IL, 6/19-8/17 
 2014 
 "Contemporary Painting", St. Francis University Gallery, Fort Wayne, IN, 11/8-12/20 
 "Nanjing International Art Festival-Exhibition", Nanjing, China 
 "The Gift of Broken Tracking Devices: Thanking with our hands" -collaboration- 
 Michiko Itatani / Judith A Kasen / Mt Coast, Experimental Sound Studio, Chicago, IL, 1/25-3/9 
 2013  
 "Through The Ages: 100 Years of RAM", Rockford Art Museum, IL 
 "Inventory-EAM Collection", Elmhurst Art Museum, IL 
"ArtWork 6", Sullivan Galleries, SAIC, Chicago, IL 
2012
" "Face Forward, The art of the Self-Portrait", Printworks Inc, Chicago IL 11/30-2/9, 2013
"Art on Paper: Prints, Drawings and Photographs" Block Museum, Evanston IL
"Mutuality - Itatani / Krantz / Senseman" Ukrainian Institute of Modern Art, Chicago, IL
"Itatani / Peltz / Rizzo / Rooney", Metropolitan Capital, Chicago, IL
2011  
"The Object Transcended" Tory Folliard Gallery, Milwaukee, WI
"International Paper Art Exhibition and Symposium", Chung Shan National Gallery, Taipei, Taiwan
"40/40", Ukrainian Institute of Modern Art, Chicago, IL
"Irritable Abstraction", Julius Caesar, Chicago, IL
2010
"Spaces Within" Rockford Art Museum, Rockford, IL
"25th Anniversary Invitational", Sherry Leedy Contemporary, MO
2009
"New Realities", New Gallery, Houston, TX
"Faculty Projects", Betty Rymer Gallery, The School of the Art Institute of Chicago, IL
"Lipstick Traces", Daum Museum, Sedalia, MO
"Arp's Atlas of Peculiar Galaxie", Schneider Museum of Art, Ashland, OR
2008
"Ahh…Decadance", Sallivan Galleries, The School of the Art Institute of Chicago, IL
2007
"From Concept to Collection", Elmhurst Art Museum, Elmhurst, IL
"Collector's Choices", Anita Shapolsky Gallery, NY, NY 
"Fragments of Change", Earnest Rubenstain Gallery, Educational Alliance, NYC
4 person show(Michiko Itatani, Carrie Moyer, Sheils Pepe, Christy Rupp)
2006
"Transfigure" GwendaJay/Addington Gallery, Chicago, IL 
"An Invitational Exhibition of Contemporary American Art", National Academy Museum, NYC
2005 
" Sensuous Delights", LoPressionism Gallery, Melbourne, FL 
"The Art of the Bookplate", Printworks, Chicago, IL
2004 
"Michiko Itatani/Pavel Kraus - Monuments & Fragments" Oakton Community College, Des Plane, IL
"That 70s Show: The Age of Pluralism in Chicago", Northern Indiana Arts Association, Munster, Indiana 
2003 
"Retrospective", Gallery 312, Chicago 
2002 
"Artists to Artists", Marie Walsh Sharp Foundation, ACE Gallery, New York City
2001 
"synesthesia", Wood Street Gallery, Chicago
"Dialogue", (4 person show), Anita Shapolsky Gallery, New York City
2000 
"Generations", AIR Gallery, New York City
1999 
"Synergy -F a/e int : A Collaboration-", Milwaukee Institute of Art & Design, Milwaukee, Wisconsin 
"Chicago Subjects", West Virginia University, West Virginia
1998 
"The Third Kind of Encounter", Taipei Gallery, New York City 
"98 Invitational Showcase", University of Bridgeport, Connecticut
1996 
"Art in Chicago 1945-95", Museum of Contemporary Art, Chicago 
"Second Sight: Printmaking in Chicago 1935-95" 
Mary & Leigh Block Museum, Northwestern University, Illinois
"Tornado Warning", Muskegon Museum of Art, Michigan
"Rapture", San Francisco State University, California
1994 
"Object Lessons", DePaul University, Chicago 
1993
"M’aidez/Mayday", Phyllis Kind Gallery, New York City
1992 
"From America’s Studio: Drawing New Conclusions", Betty Rymer Gallery, Chicago 
1991 
"Burning in Hell", Franklin Furnace, New York City
"Outspoken Women", Intermedia Arts, Minneapolis
1990 
"Osaka Triennale ‘90", Osaka, Japan
"Locations of Desire" (Bramson/ Itatani/ Klement), State of Illinois Gallery, Chicago travelled to Illinois State Museum, Springfield, Illinois
"Locations of Desire" (Bramson/ Itatani/ Klement), Brody’s Gallery, Washington D.C.
1989 
"Chicago", Maier Museum, Virginia 
"aja V", Japan American Center, Los Angeles
"Chicago Work", Erie Museum, Erie, Pennsylvania 
1988 
"Focus", Aspen Museum, Aspen, Colorado 
1987 
"Silverpoint", Leslie Cecile Gallery, New York City
"Chicago Contrast", Amerika Haus, Berlin, Stuttgart, Munchen
"Two Decades of Painting in Chicago", Terra Museum of American Art, Chicago 
1986 
"Painting/Sculpture Today ‘86", Indianapolis Museum, Indianapolis, Indiana
1985 
"Chicago & Vicinity", Art Institute of Chicago, Chicago 
"Fine Line: Drawing with Silver in America", Norton Museum, Florida 
1984 
"Alternative Spaces", Museum of Contemporary Art, Chicago

Collections 

 Olympic Museum, Lausanne, Switzerland 
 McIntosh Gallery, University of Western Ontario, London, Canada 
 American Embassy Permanent Collection, Brasilia, Brazil 
 Museu D’art Contemporani (MACBA), Barcelona, Spain
 Villa-Haiss-Museum, Zell am Harmersback, Germany
 Frauen Museum, Bonn, Germany
 Musée national des beaux-arts du Québec, Quebec, Canada 
 Tokoha Museum, Shizuoka, Japan
 Shizuoka University of Art & Culture, Shizuoka, Japan
 National Museum of Contemporary Art, Seoul, Korea
 Art Institute of Chicago, Chicago, IL 
 Museum of Contemporary Art, Chicago, IL 
 Illinois State Museum, Springfield, IL
 Koehnline Museum of Art, Des Plaines, IL
 Elmhurst Art Museum, Elmhurst, IL 
 Mary & Leigh Block Museum, Northwestern University, Evanston, IL 
 Crocker Art Museum, Sacramento, CA
 Schneider Museum of Art, Ashland, OR
 Nevada Museum of Art, Reno, NV
 Muskegon Museum of Art, Muskegon, MI
 Kresge Art Museum, Michigan State University, MI
 Cincinnati Art Museum, OH
 Wright Museum, Beloit, WI 
 Daum Museum, Sedalia, MO
 Maier Museum of Art, Charlottesville, VA
 Erie Art Museum, Erie, PA 
 Harold Washington Library, Chicago, IL 
 University of Colorado CU Art Museum, Boulder, CO
 Union League Club of Chicago, IL
 University Club of Chicago, IL
 Loyola University Museum of Art, IL

Works and publications 
 James Yood, Michiko Itatani: "Cosmic Kaleidoscope" at Linda Warren Projects, Art Ltd, Nov/Dec 2013
 Victor Cassidy, Coming to Terms-Personal Codes, Feb, 2010 
 Robin Dluzen, Michiko Itatani at Walsh, Feb 22, 2010            
 Jinny Berg, Michiko Itatani, New Series at Walsh Gallery, Feb., 2010             
 Darrel Robert, ArtStyle, Michiko Itatani: Lyrical Works on Paper, March 3, 2008            
 Margaret Howkins, "Michiko Itatani/Flatfile", ARTnews, June 2006, p. 160
 Garret Holg, "Michiko Itatani/Flatfile", ARTnews, Feb. 2005, pp. 134–5   
 "Looking Forward - Michiko Itatani - Daum Museum of Contemporary Art", Dialogue Oct. 2003 
 Kristen Brooke Schleifer, Art on Paper, July–August, 2002 Claire Wolf Krantz, Manhattan Arts International, 2002 
 Lisa Stein, Chicago Trubune, September 6, 2002 
 Von Heldrun Wirth, "Das Ende der Kindheit", Kölnische/Bonner Rundschau, May 31, 2000 
 Alan Artner, "Friday Guide", Chicago Tribune, September 18, 1998  
 James Yood, "Michiko Itatani", Artforum, March 1994 
 Gerret Holg, "Michiko Itatani", Art News, April 1992 
 Katherine Cook, "In Search of a New Cosmology", Artweek, October 4, 1990 
 Michael Weizenback, "Debut with a Difference", Washington Post, September 22, 1990 
 Kathryn Hixson, "Michiko Itatani", Arts Magazine,1990 
 Paul Krainak, "Itatani’s Mortal Apologue", Artpapers, 1989 
 Haruo Sanda, Mainichi Shinbun, August 23, 1988 
 Buzz Spector, "Michiko Itatani", Artforum, May, 1987 
 Kim Levin, "ARTWALK, Michiko Itatani, Alternative Museum", Village Voice, December 3, 1985 
 Michael Bonesteel, "Michiko Itatani & Michael Brakke", Art in America, May, 1986 
 Judith Russi Kirshner, "Michiko Itatani", Artforum, March, 1985 
 Charlotte Moser, "Michiko Itatani", Art News, March, 1985

References 

Living people
Artists from Chicago
1948 births
School of the Art Institute of Chicago alumni
School of the Art Institute of Chicago faculty
People from Osaka